Tapang Taloh is an Indian politician.
He is a member of the Legislative Assembly of Arunachal Pradesh from the Pangin Assembly constituency. In the 2014 election, he defeated Ojing Tasing.

See also
Arunachal Pradesh Legislative Assembly

References

Indian National Congress politicians
Living people
People from Adi Community
People from Siang district
Arunachal Pradesh MLAs 2014–2019
People's Party of Arunachal politicians
Bharatiya Janata Party politicians from Arunachal Pradesh
Year of birth missing (living people)
Arunachal Pradesh MLAs 2004–2009
Arunachal Pradesh MLAs 2009–2014